The  is a suburban electric multiple unit (EMU) train type operated by East Japan Railway Company (JR East) in the Kantō region of Japan since 1994.

Design
Introduced in 1994 to replace the 113 series EMUs running on the Sōbu Line (Rapid) and Yokosuka Line, the E217 series was the first outer-suburban train type in Japan to feature four pairs of doors per side per car. The basic design was developed from the 209 series commuter EMUs. It replaced all the Yokosuka Line 113 series trains by 1999. The trains were built jointly by Kawasaki Heavy Industries, Tokyu Car, and JR East (Niitsu and Ofuna factories).

For traction, they use Mitsubishi Electric-manufactured VVVF inverters with IGBT (formerly GTO) switching devices which control Mitsubishi MT68/73 traction motors. The gear ratio is 97:16.

Operations
 Kashima Line (Sawara - Kashima-Jingū)
 Narita Line (Chiba - Narita Airport, Sawara)
 Sōbu Main Line (Tokyo - Narutō)
 Sotobō Line (Chiba - Kazusa-Ichinomiya)
 Uchibō Line (Chiba - Kimitsu)
 Yokosuka Line (Tokyo - Kurihama)

Former operations
 Shōnan–Shinjuku Line (Shinjuku - Zushi) (December 2001 - October 2004)
 Tōkaidō Main Line (Tokyo - Atami) (March 2006 - March 2015)
 Airport Narita (name discontinued March 2018)

Formations

Current formations

11-car Yokosuka/Sōbu Line sets

, 38 11-car sets are based at Kamakura Depot and formed with four motored ("M") cars and seven non-powered trailer ("T") cars.

 Cars 3 and 9 each have one scissors pantograph.
 Cars 1 and 11 have an accessible/priority "free space".
 Cars 1, 5, and 11 each have a toilet (universal design in car 1, Japanese-style in car 11).
 Car 8 is designated as a mildly air-conditioned car.
 Cars 4 and 5 are bilevel Green Cars with transverse seating.
 Cars 9, 10, and 11 have a mix of longitudinal and transverse box seating.

4-car Yokosuka/Sōbu Line sets

, 30 four-car sets are based at Kamakura Depot and formed with two motored ("M") cars and two non-powered trailer ("T") cars.

 Car +3 has a scissors pantograph.
 Cars +1 and +4 have an accessible/priority "free space".
 Car +1 has a Japanese-style toilet.

Previous formations

10-car Tōkaidō Line sets

Three 10-car sets (F-01–F-03) were based at Kōzu Depot and formed with four motored ("M") cars and six non-powered trailer ("T") cars.

 Cars 3 and 9 each had one scissors pantograph.
 Cars 1 and 10 had an accessible/priority "free space".
 Cars 1, 5, and 10 each had a toilet (universal design in car 1, Japanese-style in car 10).
 Car 8 was designated as a mildly air-conditioned car.
 Cars 4 and 5 were bilevel Green Cars with transverse seating.
 Cars 9 and 10 had a mix of longitudinal and transverse box seating.

5-car Tōkaidō Line sets

Three five-car sets (F-51–F-53) were based at Kōzu Depot and formed with two motored ("M") cars and three non-powered trailer ("T") cars.

 Car 13 had a scissors pantograph.
 Cars 11 and 15 had an accessible/priority "free space".
 Car 11 had a Japanese-style toilet.
 Car 14 had a mix of longitudinal and transverse box seating.

Interior

History

The E217 series trains entered revenue service from 3 December 1994.

From December 2001, 11-car trains were used on the Shōnan–Shinjuku Line between Shinjuku and Zushi. This continued until October 2004 when Shōnan–Shinjuku Line services were unified using E231-1000 series trains.

In March 2006, three 15-car trains were reformed as 10+5-car sets and transferred to Kōzu depot for use from 14 March 2006 on Tōkaidō Main Line duties out of Tokyo alongside E231-1000 series trains. The sets were repainted into the same Shonan color scheme of orange and green bodyside stripes as applied to the E231s. These sets were all transferred back to Yokosuka/Sōbu Line services by March 2015.

A program of refurbishment on the fleet commenced in 2008 and was completed in 2012. Externally, sets received lighter blue and cream stripes.

Following the introduction of newer E235-1000 series sets, withdrawals commenced in fiscal 2020. The first withdrawn set was transferred to Nagano between 5 and 6 January 2021.

Incidents
On 25 December 2014, an 11+4 car train consisting of sets Y12 and Y129 broke down on the Yokosuka Line due to electrical problems; another 11+4 car train consisting of sets Y23 and Y130 was sent to tow the faulty set from Tokyo Station to Kamakura Depot, creating an immensely long thirty-car train. While this was happening, the entire train did not stop at any stations to pick up any passengers.

References

Further reading

External links

 JR E217 series 

Electric multiple units of Japan
East Japan Railway Company
Train-related introductions in 1994
Kawasaki multiple units
1500 V DC multiple units of Japan
Tokyu Car multiple units